Colin Fleming and Ken Skupski were the defending champions, but they chose to start in Moscow.
Pierre-Hugues Herbert and Nicolas Renavand, which received wildcards to the doubles main draw, won the final 7–6(3), 1–6, [10–6], against Sébastien Grosjean and Nicolas Mahut.

Seeds

Draw

Draw

External links
 Main Draw

Doubles